The 1986-87 French Rugby Union Championship was won by Toulon that beat Racing Paris in the final.

Formula 

The 40 clubs were divided in 4 pools of ten.

The first five of pool 1 and 2 and the first three of pool 3 and 4, were qualified for knock out stages.

This formula will be used only for this year.

Qualification round 
The teams are listed as the ranking, in bold the teams admitted  to "last 16" round.

Knock out stages

"Last 16" 
In bold the clubs qualified for the next round . All the qualified, came from pool 1 and 2.

Quarter of finals 
In bold the clubs qualified for the next round

Semifinals

Final 

Toulon won his second Bouclier de Brennus, after the first in 1931, and after 4 final lost (1948, 1968, 1971 and 1985).

The team of Racing play the match wearing a pink papillon.

External links 
 Compte rendu de the final de 1987 lnr.fr
 Retransmission de la fin de the final 1987 borcxv.sport24.com

1987
France 1987
Championship